Dr. Y. S. Rajasekhara Reddy International Cricket Stadium is a multi-purpose stadium in Visakhapatnam, Andhra Pradesh, India. It is primarily used for international cricket matches, and also a proposed future home ground for I-League club Sreenidhi Deccan FC. The stadium has two-tiers and was designed to avoid any restricted view seats, eliminating pillars or columns which come in the field of view of spectators in some of the Indian stadiums. The pitch is known as a batter friendly one.

Ground profile

Pitch and Outfield

The pitch assists spinners and the ball does not bounce much and hence, batting second is not always beneficial, though dew factor sometimes plays a significant role. In recent matches, team batting second in a T20 match have even struggled to post even 80 runs on the board. The highest ODI Score here is 387 by India against West Indies, 2019.

History
The stadium hosted its first ODI match against Pakistan, in which Mahendra Singh Dhoni scored his maiden one day international century (148) in 2005. After being given Test status, it hosted its first test match in November 2016, between India and England. India won the match by 246 runs. The Stadium hosted its first T20I in February 2016 between India and Sri Lanka, in Which Ravichandran Ashwin took 4 wickets for 8 runs in his 4 over spell bundling out Sri Lanka for 83.

The stadium also hosted IPL matches and was the home ground of Deccan Chargers in 2012 and Sunrisers Hyderabad in 2015 along with Rising Pune Supergiants and Mumbai Indians together in 2016.

Although this Stadium did not host any group stage matches in the 2019 Indian Premier League, it was selected to host the Eliminator and Qualifier 2 of the tournament.

Stats & records
 List of international cricket centuries at ACA-VDCA Cricket Stadiums

Matches hosted
Test — 2
 ODI — 11
 T20I — 3
 (as on 18 December 2019)

Facts
 MS Dhoni scored his maiden ODI hundred (148) at this ground when Pakistan toured India in 2005.
 Rohit Sharma scored 159 off 138((17*4,5*6)) balls against West Indies on 18 December 2019, which is the highest individual ODI score for any batsmen on this ground.
 Rohit Sharma scored his first Test Hundred in his first innings as Test Opener on 3 October 2019, later in the same Test match, Rohit scored another 100 in the second innings. In the same test he smashed 13 sixes, that is the highest total for an individual in a test.  
 Mayank Agarwal recorded his maiden Test Hundred and converted it into a double hundred (215) at this ground, which is the highest individual Test score for any batsmen on this ground.
 Highest ODI score posted by a team was 387/5 by India, vs West Indies, 2019.
 Rohit Sharma and K. L. Rahul scored 100's each and recorded 227 runs for the first wicket for India, vs West Indies, 2019.
 First time in an ODI that both captains Virat Kohli and Kieron Pollard have been dismissed for a first ball duck, on 18 December 2019.
 Kuldeep Yadav picked up his second ODI hat trick at this ground, vs West Indies, 2019.

List of centuries

Key
 * denotes that the batsman was not out.
 Inns. denotes the number of the innings in the match.
 Balls denotes the number of balls faced in an innings.
 NR denotes that the number of balls was not recorded.
 Parentheses next to the player's score denotes his century number at Edgbaston.
 The column title Date refers to the date the match started.
 The column title Result refers to the player's team result

Tests

ODIs

List of five wicket hauls

Key

Tests

One Day Internationals

Notable events
 Due to water scarcity in Maharashtra during the IPL 2016 season, Mumbai Indians and Rising Pune Supergiants played 3 games each at this stadium. Visakhapatnam served as a home venue for both the teams.
 Rising Pune Supergiants skipper Mahendra Singh Dhoni [when CSK was facing eviction in 2016 & 2017] scored 22 runs off final over against Axar Patel of Kings XI Punjab on 21 May 2016 to secure one of the highest chases in T20s at this stadium.
 In 2016, Visakhapatnam hosted all 3 international formats in the same year in which India won the T20I, ODI and Test against Sri Lanka, New Zealand and England respectively.
 On 24 October 2018, Virat Kohli became the fastest player to score 10,000 ODI runs with 205 innings surpassing Sachin Tendulkar. He achieved this feat during the second ODI against West Indies.
 In 2019, due to the General Elections in India, Visakhapatnam was named as Standby venue for IPL 2019. Even though this stadium has not hosted any group stage matches, it was selected to host the playoffs stage of 2019 Indian Premier League for the first time.

Gallery

References

External links

 Visakhapatnam ACA-VDCA Cricket Stadium at ESPNcricinfo
 Visakhapatnam Cricket Stadium at CricketArchive

Cricket grounds in Andhra Pradesh
Multi-purpose stadiums in India
Sports venues in Visakhapatnam
Sports venues completed in 2003
2003 establishments in Andhra Pradesh
Test cricket grounds in India